

Days of the month

28 July 2012 (Saturday)

Rugby union
Super Rugby Semifinals in Cape Town, Western Cape, South Africa: Stormers  19–26  Sharks

27 July 2012 (Friday)

Rugby union
Super Rugby Semifinals in Hamilton, Waikato, New Zealand: Chiefs  20–17  Crusaders

23 July 2012 (Monday)

Baseball
Nippon Professional Baseball All-Star Series:
Game 3 in Morioka, Iwate: Pacific League 6, Central League 2. Central League win series 2–1.
Hokkaido Nippon-Ham Fighters outfielder DaiKan Yoh is named game MVP with three hits and four RBIs, including a game-winning three-run home run in the 3rd inning.

22 July 2012 (Sunday)

Equestrianism
Show jumping: Royal International Horse Show in Hickstead, United Kingdom (CSIO 5*):
 King Georges V Gold Cup:  Hendrik-Jan Schuttert  on Cerona  Ludger Beerbaum  on Chiara  Marie Hecart  on Myself de Breve

Sumo
Nagoya basho (July grand tournament) in Nagoya, Aichi, Japan:
Harumafuji Kōhei defeats Hakuhō Shō to finish the tournament with a perfect 15–0 record, and wins his 3rd makuuchi (top division) championship.

21 July 2012 (Saturday)

Baseball
Nippon Professional Baseball All-Star Series:
Game 2 in Matsuyama, Ehime: Central League 4, Pacific League 0. Central League lead series 2–0.
Hiroshima Toyo Carp pitcher Kenta Maeda wins game MVP after pitching three scoreless innings with only one hit.

Equestrianism
Show jumping: Global Champions Tour:
8th competition in Chantilly (CSI 5*):  Hans-Dieter Dreher  on Magnus Romeo  Beezie Madden  on Simon  Karim El Zoghby  on Splendor

Mixed martial arts
UFC 149 in Calgary, Alberta, Canada (USA unless stated):
Welterweight bout: Matt Riddle def. Chris Clements  via submission (arm-triangle choke)
Welterweight bout: James Head def. Brian Ebersole via split decision (29–28, 28–29, 29–28)
Heavyweight bout: Cheick Kongo  def. Shawn Jordan via unanimous decision (30–28, 30–27, 30–27)	
Middleweight bout: Tim Boetsch def. Hector Lombard  via split decision (29–28, 28–29, 29–28)
Interim Bantamweight Championship bout: Renan Barão  def. Urijah Faber via unanimous decision (49–46, 50–45, 49–46)

Rugby union
Super Rugby Qualifying finals:
In Christchurch, Canterbury, New Zealand: Crusaders  28–13  Bulls
In Brisbane, Queensland, Australia: Reds  17–30  Sharks

20 July 2012 (Friday)

Baseball
Nippon Professional Baseball All-Star Series:
Game 1 in Osaka: Central League 4, Pacific League 1. Central League lead series 1–0.
Yokohama DeNA BayStars third baseman Norihiro Nakamura is named game MVP after hitting a game-winning two-run home run in the 2nd inning.

Equestrianism
Show jumping: FEI Nations Cup:
7th competition: Nations Cup of the United Kingdom in Hickstead (CSIO 5*):   (Shane Breen, Richie Moloney, Darragh Kerins, Clement McMahon)   (Eugénie Angot, Kevin Staut, Aymeric de Ponnat, Pénélope Leprevost)   (Philipp Weishaupt, Holger Wulschner, Ludger Beerbaum, Marco Kutscher)

15 July 2012 (Sunday)

Equestrianism
Falsterbo Horse Show in Skanör med Falsterbo, Sweden:
Dressage (CDI 5*): Grand Prix Freestyle:  Patrik Kittel  on Scandic  Isabell Werth  on El Santo NRW  Tinne Vilhelmson-Silfven  on Favourit
Show jumping (CSIO 5*): Grand Prix:  Nicola Philippaerts  on Carlos  Brianne Goutal  on Nice de Prissey  Peder Fredricson  on Cash In

14 July 2012 (Saturday)

Equestrianism
Show jumping: Global Champions Tour:
7th competition in Cascais (CSI 5*):  Philipp Weishaupt  on Leoville  Michael Whitaker  on Viking  Ludger Beerbaum  on Chaman

Mixed martial arts
Strikeforce: Rockhold vs. Kennedy in Portland, Oregon, United States  (USA unless stated):
Middleweight bout: Lorenz Larkin def. Robbie Lawler via unanimous decision (30–27, 30–27, 30–27)
Middleweight bout: Roger Gracie  def. Keith Jardine via unanimous decision (29–27, 30–27, 30–26)
Welterweight Championship bout: Nate Marquardt def. Tyron Woodley (c) via KO (elbows and punches)
Middleweight Championship bout: Luke Rockhold (c) def. Tim Kennedy via unanimous decision (49–46, 49–46, 49–46)

13 July 2012 (Friday)

Equestrianism
Show jumping: FEI Nations Cup:
6th competition: FEI Nations Cup of Sweden in Skanör med Falsterbo (CSIO 5*):   (Jens Fredricson, Malin Baryard-Johnsson, Henrik von Eckermann, Rolf-Göran Bengtsson)   (William Funnell, Alexandra Thornton, Tina Fletcher, Robert Smith)   (Jerome Hurel, Aymeric de Ponnat, Marc Dilasser, Pénélope Leprevost)

11 July 2012 (Wednesday)

Mixed martial arts
UFC on Fuel TV: Munoz vs. Weidman in San Jose, California, United States:
Lightweight bout: Rafael dos Anjos  def. Anthony Njokuani  via unanimous decision (30–27, 30–27, 29–28)
Bantamweight bout: T.J. Dillashaw  def. Vaughan Lee  via submission (rear-naked crank)
Middleweight bout: Francis Carmont  def. Karlos Vemola  via submission (rear-naked choke)
Welterweight bout: Aaron Simpson  def. Kenny Robertson  via unanimous decision (30–27, 29–28, 29–28)	
Light Heavyweight bout: James Te-Huna  def. Joey Beltran  via unanimous decision (30–26, 30–27, 30–27)	
Middleweight bout: Chris Weidman  def. Mark Muñoz  via KO (elbow and punches)

10 July 2012 (Tuesday)

Baseball
Major League Baseball All-Star Game in Kansas City, Missouri: National League 8, American League 0.
The National League win the game for the third successive year, first time since 1994 to 1996. San Francisco Giants outfielder Melky Cabrera is named as Most Valuable Player, with two hits including a two-run homer in the fourth inning.

Basketball
Stanković Continental Champions' Cup in Guangzhou, China:
Third place play-off:   80–51 
Gold medal match:   70–51

Chess
World Rapid and Blitz Championships in Astana, Kazakhstan:
Rapid Chess:  Sergey Karjakin   Magnus Carlsen   Veselin Topalov 
Blitz Chess:  Alexander Grischuk   Magnus Carlsen   Sergey Karjakin

Modern pentathlon
Senior European Championships in Sofia, Bulgaria:
Men:
Individual:  Riccardo de Luca   Róbert Kasza   Bence Demeter 
Team:  Bence Demeter / Róbert Kasza / Ádám Marosi   Ilia Frolov / Aleksander Lesun / Andrei Moiseev   Delf Borrmann / Patrick Dogue / Alexander Nobis 
Team relay:  Ilia Frolov / Serguei Karyakin / Alexander Savkin   Pavlo Kirpulyanskyy / Ruslan Nakonechnyi / Oleksandr Mordasov   Mikhail Mitsyk / Aliaksandr Vasilionak / Raman Pinchuk 
Women:
Individual:  Laura Asadauskaitė   Iryna Khokhlova   Ganna Buriak 
Team:  Evdokia Gretchichnikova / Ekaterina Khuraskina / Donata Rimšaitė   Katy Burke / Heather Fell / Freyja Prentice   Leila Gyenesei / Sarolta Kovács / Adrienn Tóth 
Team relay:  Donata Rimšaitė / Anna Savchenko / Svetlana Lebedeva   Sylvia Gawlikowska / Katarzyna Wojcik / Aleksandra Skarzynska   Freyja Prentice / Heather Fell / Katy Burke 
Mixed:
Team relay:  Anastasiya Prokopenko / Mihail Prokopenko   Laura Asadauskaitė / Justinas Kinderis   Natalie Dianova / David Svoboda

9 July 2012 (Monday)

Baseball
Major League Baseball Home Run Derby in Kansas City, Missouri: Detroit Tigers first baseman Prince Fielder defeats Toronto Blue Jays outfielder José Bautista in the finals, 12–7, to win the event.

Cycling
Tour de France:

Motorsports
2012 Porsche Supercup season at the Silverstone Circuit, Great Britain:
 René Rast   Norbert Siedler   Sean Edwards

8 July 2012 (Sunday)

Baseball
All-Star Futures Game in Kansas City, Missouri: U.S. Futures 17, World Futures 5.
U.S. win the game for the third successive year and the eighth time overall. Detroit Tigers third baseman Nick Castellanos is named game MVP.

Basketball
FIBA World Olympic Qualifying Tournament for Men in Caracas, Venezuela:
Third-place match:  88–73 
Nigeria qualify for 2012 Summer Olympics.
Stanković Continental Champions' Cup in Guangzhou, China:
Group stage:
 62–60 
 73–67

Cycling
Tour de France:

Equestrianism
CHIO in Aachen, Germany:
 Dressage: Grand Prix Freestyle (CDIO 5*):  Helen Langehanenberg  with Damon Hill NRW  Kristina Sprehe  with Desperados  Dorothee Schneider  with Diva Royal
 Show jumping: Grand Prix of Aachen (CSIO 5*):  Michael Whitaker  with Amai  Thomas Voß  with Carinjo  Meredith Michaels-Beerbaum  with Bella Donna

Football (soccer)
CAF Champions League Group stage Matchday 1:

Golf

Motorsports
2012 Formula Renault 2.0 NEC season at the Motorsport Arena Oschersleben, Germany:
 Jake Dennis   Josh Hill   Steijn Schothorst 
2012 Australian Carrera Cup Championship at the Townsville Street Circuit, Australia:
 Jonny Reid   Alex Davison   Craig Baird 
2012 Australian Formula Ford Championship at the Townsville Street Circuit, Australia:
 Jack Le Brocq   Matthew Hart   Simon Hodge 
2012 Dunlop V8 Supercar Series at the Townsville Street Circuit, Australia:
 Nick Percat   Scott McLaughlin   Chaz Mostert 
2012 International V8 Supercars Championship at the Townsville Street Circuit, Australia:
 Jamie Whincup   Craig Lowndes   Will Davison 
2012 British Superbike Championship season at Oulton Park, England:
Race 1:  Tommy Hill   Josh Brookes   Shane Byrne 
2012 British Superbike Championship season at Oulton Park, England:
Race 2:  Tommy Hill   Shane Byrne   Josh Brookes 
2012 Formula Abarth season at the Misano World Circuit, Italy:
Race 1:  Nicolas Costa   Emanuele Zonzini   Santiago Urrutia 
2012 Formula Abarth season at the Misano World Circuit, Italy:
Race 2:  Nicolas Costa   Bruno Bonifacio   Kevin Jörg 
2012 German Formula Three season at the Motorsport Arena Oschersleben, Germany:
 Jimmy Eriksson   Lucas Auer   Artem Markelov 
2012 GP2 Series season at the Silverstone Circuit, Great Britain:
 Luiz Razia   Davide Valsecchi   Felipe Nasr 
2012 GP3 Series season at the Silverstone Circuit, Great Britain:
 William Buller   Conor Daly   Patric Niederhauser 
2012 Copa Fiat Brasil season at the Autódromo Internacional Ayrton Senna, Brazil:
Race 1:  Christian Fittipaldi   Cacá Bueno   Edson do Valle 
Race 2:  Christian Fittipaldi   Popó Beuno   Giuliano Losacco 
2012 FIA GT1 World Championship season at the Autódromo Internacional do Algarve, Portugal:
Race 1:  Marc Basseng / Markus Winkelhock   Michael Bartels  / Yelmer Buurman   Oliver Jarvis  / Frank Stippler 
Race 2:  Thomas Jäger  / Nicky Pastorelli   Mark Basseng / Markus Winkelhock   Stef Dusseldorp  / Frédéric Makowiecki 
2012 FIA GT3 European Championship season at the Autódromo Internacional do Algarve, Portugal:
Race 1:  Dominik Baumann  / Maximilian Buhk   Mika Vähämäki  / Max Nilsson   David Mengesdorf  / Hari Proczyk 
Race 2:  David Mengesdorf  / Hari Proczyk   Ni Amorim / César Campaniço   Gaetano Ardagna Pérez  / Giuseppe Cirò 
2012 Formula One season at the Silverstone Circuit, Great Britain:
 Mark Webber   Fernando Alonso   Sebastian Vettel 
2012 Fórmula Truck season at the Autódromo José Carlos Pace, Brazil:
 Leandro Totti   Roberval Andrade   Adalberto Jardim 
2012 Grand Prix motorcycle racing season – Moto GP at the Sachsenring, Germany:
 Dani Pedrosa   Jorge Lorenzo   Andrea Dovizioso 
2012 Grand Prix motorcycle racing season – Moto 2 at the Sachsenring, Germany:
 Marc Márquez   Mika Kallio   Alex de Angelis 
2012 Grand Prix motorcycle racing season – Moto 3 at the Sachsenring, Germany:
 Sandro Cortese   Alexis Masbou   Luis Salom 
2012 IndyCar Series season at the Streets of Toronto, Canada:
 Ryan Hunter-Reay   Charlie Kimball   Mike Conway 
2012 NASCAR Stock V6 Series at the Autódromo Hermanos Rodríguez, Mexico:
 Oscar Torres Jr.   Javier Campos   Erik Mondragón

Tennis
Wimbledon Championships in London, Great Britain, day 13:
Men's singles final: Roger Federer  [3] def. Andy Murray  [4] 4−6, 7−5, 6–3, 6–4
Federer wins his seventh Wimbledon title and 17th Grand Slam title overall.
Mixed doubles final: Mike Bryan  / Lisa Raymond  [2] def. Leander Paes  / Elena Vesnina  [4] 6–3, 5–7, 6–4

Volleyball
FIVB World League Final round in Sofia, Bulgaria:
Third place match:  2–3  
Final:   3–0

7 July 2012 (Saturday)

Basketball
FIBA World Olympic Qualifying Tournament for Men in Caracas, Venezuela:
Semifinals: (winners qualify for 2012 Summer Olympics)
 85–77 
 109–83 
Stanković Continental Champions' Cup in Guangzhou, China:
Group stage:
 63–53 
 67–44

Cricket
Australia in England:
4th ODI in Chester-le-Street:  200/9 (50 overs),  201/2 (47.5 overs). England win by 8 wickets and lead the 5-match series 3–0.
New Zealand in the West Indies:
2nd ODI in Kingston:  315/5 (50 overs),  260 (47 overs). West Indies win by 55 runs and lead the 5-match series 2–0.

Cycling
Tour de France:
Stage 7:  Chris Froome   Cadel Evans   Bradley Wiggins  (Team Sky)
General classification:  Wiggins  Evans  Vincenzo Nibali 
Points:  Peter Sagan , Mountains:  Froome, Young:  Rein Taaramäe , Team:  Team Sky , Combat:  Luis León Sánchez 

Equestrianism
Eventing: FEI Nations Cup:
4th competition:
Team result: FEI Nations Cup of Germany in Aachen (CICO 3*):   (Sandra Auffarth, Dirk Schrade, Michael Jung, Ingrid Klimke)   (Laura Collett, William Fox-Pitt, Francis Whittington, Emily Baldwin)   (Ludwig Svennerstål, Niklas Jonsson, Hannes Melin)
Individual result:  Christopher Burton  with Underdiscussion  Michael Jung  with Sam FBW  Laura Collett  with Rayef

Football (soccer)
CAF Champions League Group stage Matchday 1:
Group A: ASO Chlef  –  Étoile du Sahel
Group B: Berekum Chelsea  –  Zamalek

Mixed martial arts
UFC 148 in Las Vegas, Nevada, United States (USA unless stated):
Bantamweight bout: Mike Easton def. Ivan Menjivar  via unanimous decision (30–27, 29–28, 30–27)
Featherweight bout: Chad Mendes def. Cody McKenzie via TKO (punches)
Welterweight bout: Demian Maia  def. Dong Hyun Kim  via TKO (rib injury)
Middleweight bout: Cung Le def. Patrick Côté  via unanimous decision (30–27, 30–27, 30–27)
Light Heavyweight bout: Forrest Griffin def. Tito Ortiz via unanimous decision (29–28, 29–28, 29–28)
Middleweight Championship bout: Anderson Silva  (c) def. Chael Sonnen via TKO (punches)

Motorsports
2012 Formula Renault 2.0 NEC season at the Motorsport Arena Oschersleben, Germany:
Race 1:  Josh Hill   Jordan King   Jake Dennis 
2012 Formula Renault 2.0 NEC season at the Motorsport Arena Oschersleben, Germany:
Race 2:  Josh Hill   Jordan King   Alessio Picariello 
2012 Intercontinental Rally Challenge season in San Marino:
 Giandomenico Basso   Andreas Mikkelsen   Umberto Scandola 
2012 Australian Carrera Cup Championship at the Townsville Street Circuit, Australia:
 Jonny Reid   Craig Baird   Alex Davison 
2012 Dunlop V8 Supercar Series at the Townsville Street Circuit, Australia:
 Scott McLaughlin   George Miedecke   Nick Percat 
2012 International V8 Supercars Championship at the Townsville Street Circuit, Australia:
 Jamie Whincup   Mark Winterbottom   Garth Tander 
2012 Indy Lights season at the Streets of Toronto, Canada:
 Gustavo Yacamán   Sebastián Saavedra   Victor Carbone 
2012 NASCAR Sprint Cup Series at the Daytona International Speedway, United States:
 Tony Stewart   Jeff Burton   Matt Kenseth 
2012 NASCAR Toyota Series season at the Autódromo Hermanos Rodríguez, Mexico:
 Hugo Oliveiras   Rogelio López   Abraham Calderón 
2012 British Superbike Championship season at Oulton Park, England:
 Tommy Hill   Josh Brookes   Shane Byrne 
2012 Formula Abarth season at the Misano World Circuit, Italy:
 Luca Ghiotto   Bruno Bonifacio   Nicolas Costa 
2012 German Formula Three season at the Motorsport Arena Oschersleben, Germany:
Race 1:  Jimmy Eriksson   Mitchell Gilbert   Tom Blomqvist 
2012 German Formula Three season at the Motorsport Arena Oschersleben, Germany:
Race 2:  Kimiya Sato   Yannick Mettler   Jimmy Eriksson 
2012 GP2 Series season at the Silverstone Circuit, Great Britain:
 Esteban Gutiérrez   Johnny Cecotto Jr.   Jolyon Palmer 
2012 GP3 Series season at the Silverstone Circuit, Great Britain:
 António Félix da Costa   Mitch Evans   Aaro Vainio

Tennis
Wimbledon Championships in London, Great Britain, day 12:
Women's singles final: Serena Williams  [6] def. Agnieszka Radwańska  [3] 6–1, 5–7, 6–2
Williams wins her fifth Wimbledon singles title, and her 14th Grand Slam singles title overall.
Men's doubles final: Jonathan Marray  / Frederik Nielsen  [WC] def. Robert Lindstedt  / Horia Tecău  [5] 4–6, 6–4, 7–6(7–5), 6–7(5–7), 6–3
Marray and Nielsen win their first title. Marray becomes the first British man to win a Wimbledon seniors title since 1936.
Women's doubles final: Serena Williams  / Venus Williams  def. Andrea Hlaváčková  / Lucie Hradecká  [6] 7–5, 6–4
The Williams sisters win their fifth Wimbledon doubles title, and their 13th Grand Slam doubles title overall.

Volleyball
FIVB World League Final round in Sofia, Bulgaria:
Semifinals:
 3–0 
 3–0

6 July 2012 (Friday)

Athletics
IAAF Diamond League:
Meeting Areva in Saint-Denis, France:

Basketball
FIBA World Olympic Qualifying Tournament for Men in Caracas, Venezuela:
Quarterfinals:
 80–65 
 79–80 
 72–76 
 86–76 
Stanković Continental Champions' Cup in Guangzhou, China:
Group Stage:
 85–54 
 61–76

Cycling
Tour de France:
Stage 6:  Peter Sagan   André Greipel   Matthew Goss 
General classification:  Fabian Cancellara   Bradley Wiggins   Sylvain Chavanel 
Points:  Peter Sagan , Mountains:  Michael Mørkøv , Young:  Tejay van Garderen , Team:  Team Sky , Combat:  David Zabriskie 
Tour of Austria:
Stage 6:  Sacha Modolo   Daniele Colli   Danilo Napolitano 
General classification:  Jakob Fuglsang 
Course de Solidarność et des Champions Olympiques:
Stage 4:  Adrian Honkisz   Matej Mugerli   Luc Hagenaars 
General classification:  Marko Kump

Football (soccer)
Arab Nations Cup in Saudi Arabia:
Final:   1–1 (1–3 Pen.)  
UEFA European Under-19 Football Championship in Tallinn, Estonia:
Group A:
 1–4 
 3–3 
Group B:
 1–0 
 1–2

Motorsports
2012 NASCAR Nationwide Series at the Daytona International Speedway, United States:
 Kurt Busch   Ricky Stenhouse Jr.   Michael Annett 
2012 Australian Carrera Cup Championship at the Townsville Street Circuit, Australia:
 Alex Davison   Jonny Reid   Craig Baird 
2012 Dunlop V8 Supercar Series at the Townsville Street Circuit, Australia:
 Scott McLaughlin   Nick Percat   Chaz Mostert

Tennis
Wimbledon Championships in London, Great Britain, day 11:
Men's Singles semifinals:
Roger Federer  [3] def. Novak Djokovic  [1] 6–3, 3–6, 6–4, 6–3
Andy Murray  [4] def. Jo-Wilfried Tsonga  [5] 6–3, 6–4, 3–6, 7–5

Volleyball
FIVB World League Final round in Sofia, Bulgaria:
Pool E:  3–0 
Pool F:  3–0

5 July 2012 (Thursday)

Cycling
Tour de France:
Stage 5:  André Greipel   Matthew Goss   Juan José Haedo 
General classification:  Fabian Cancellara   Bradley Wiggins   Sylvain Chavanel 
Points:  Peter Sagan , Mountains:  Michael Mørkøv , Young:  Tejay van Garderen , Team:  Team Sky , Combat:  Mathieu Ladagnous 
Tour of Qinghai Lake:
Stage 7:  Aldo Ino Ilesic   Jake Keough   Cristian Benenati 
General classification:  Hossein Alizadeh 
Tour of Austria:
Stage 5:  Fabio Taborre   Marco Bandiera   Matthias Brändle 
General classification:  Jakob Fuglsang 
Course de Solidarność et des Champions Olympiques:
Stage 3:  André Schulze   Andrea Palini   Marko Kump 
General classification:  André Schulze 
Giro d'Italia Femminile:
Stage 7:  Marianne Vos   Emma Johansson   Fabiana Luperini 
General classification:  Marianne Vos 
Tour de Feminin:
Stage 1:  Larisa Pankova   Rozanne Slik   Kirsten Wild 
General classification:  Larisa Pankova

Cricket
ICC World Cricket League Championship in Dublin, Ireland: 
 163 (47 overs);  104 (33.1 overs). Ireland win by 59 runs.

Equestrianism
Show jumping: FEI Nations Cup:
5th competition: FEI Nations Cup of Germany in Aachen (CSIO 5*):   (Eugénie Angot, Roger-Yves Bost, Pénélope Leprevost, Olivier Guillon)   (Marcus Ehning, Christian Ahlmann, Janne Friederike Meyer, Marco Kutscher)   (Denis Lynch, Dermott Lennon, Billy Twomey, Cian O'Connor)

Football (soccer)
UEFA Europa League First qualifying round, first leg:
Khazar Lankaran  2–2 Nõmme Kalju 
Narva Trans  0–5 Inter Baku 
Renova  4–0 Libertas 
Jagodina  0–1 Ordabasy 
KuPS  2–1 Llanelli 
Levadia Tallinn  1–0 Šiauliai 
Baku  0–0 Mura 05 
Elfsborg  8–0 Floriana 
Rudar Pljevlja  0–1 Shirak 
Pyunik  0–3 Zeta 
JJK  2–0 Stabæk 
Differdange 03  3–0 NSÍ Runavík 
Dacia Chişinău  1–0 Celje 
Sūduva Marijampolė  0–1 Daugava 
Tirana  2–0 Grevenmacher 
Torpedo Kutaisi  1–1 Aktobe 
Birkirkara  2–2 Metalurg Skopje 
FC Santa Coloma  0–1 Osijek 
Sarajevo  5–2 Hibernians 
Twente  6–0 UE Santa Coloma 
Lech Poznań  2–0 Zhetysu 
Olimpija Ljubljana  3–0 Jeunesse Esch 
EB/Streymur  3–1 Gandzasar 
MTK Budapest  1–1 Senica 
Cefn Druids  0–0 MYPA 
Flamurtari Vlorë  0–1 Honvéd 
Teuta Durrës  0–3 Metalurgi Rustavi 
La Fiorita  0–2 Liepājas Metalurgs 
Bohemians  0–0 Þór Akureyri 
Cliftonville  1–0 Kalmar FF 
St. Patrick's Athletic  1–0 ÍBV 
Bangor City  0–0 Zimbru Chişinău 
Crusaders  0–3 Rosenborg 
Borac Banja Luka  2–2 Čelik Nikšić 
FH  2–1 Eschen/Mauren 
UEFA Women's U-19 Championship in Turkey:
Group A:
 0–1 
 1–0 
Group B:
 4–0 
 1–5 
Arab Nations Cup in Saudi Arabia:
Third place play-off:
 0–1  
Arab U-20 Championship in Amman, Jordan:
Group B:
 1–4 
 0–0 
Arab U-17 Championship in Tunisia:
Group A:
 0–2 
 4–0

Tennis
Wimbledon Championships in London, Great Britain, day 10:
Women's singles semifinals:
Agnieszka Radwańska  [3] def. Angelique Kerber  [8] 6–3, 6–4
Serena Williams  [6] def. Victoria Azarenka  [2] 6–3, 7–6(8–6)

Volleyball
FIVB World League Final round in Sofia, Bulgaria:
Pool E:  3–2 
Pool F:  2–3

4 July 2012 (Wednesday)

Basketball
FIBA World Olympic Qualifying Tournament for Men in Caracas, Venezuela:
Group A:  98–84 
Group B:  86–80 
Group C:  84–69 
Group D:  64–68

Cricket
Australia in England:
3rd ODI in Birmingham: Match abandoned without a ball bowled, England lead the 5-match series 2–0. 
Pakistan in Sri Lanka:
2nd Test in Colombo, day 5:  551/6d (147 overs) & 100/2d (18 overs);  391 (124.4 overs) & 86/2 (22 overs). Match drawn, Sri Lanka lead the 3-match series 1–0. 
ICC World Cricket League Championship:
1st ODI in Dublin:  v , Match abandoned without a ball bowled.

Cycling
Tour de France:
Stage 4:  André Greipel   Alessandro Petacchi   Tom Veelers 
General classification:  Fabian Cancellara   Bradley Wiggins   Sylvain Chavanel 
Points:  Peter Sagan , Mountains:  Michael Mørkøv , Young:  Tejay van Garderen , Team:  Team Sky , Combat:  Yukiya Arashiro 
Tour of Qinghai Lake:
Stage 6:  Luka Mezgec   Kiel Reijnen   Maksym Averin 
General classification:  Hossein Alizadeh 
Tour of Austria:
Stage 4:  Jakob Fuglsang   Leopold König   Robert Vrečer 
General classification:  Jakob Fuglsang 
Course de Solidarność et des Champions Olympiques:
Stage 1:  Jeff Vermeulen   Ralf Matzka   André Schulze 
General classification:  Jeff Vermeulen 
Stage 2:  André Schulze   Marko Kump   Michael Schweizer 
General classification:  André Schulze 
Sibiu Cycling Tour:
Prologue:  Jon Einar Bergsland   Ioannis Tamouridis   Joeri Adams 
General classification:  Jon Einar Bergsland 
Giro d'Italia Femminile:
Stage 6:  Shelley Olds   Marianne Vos   Giorgia Bronzini 
General classification:  Marianne Vos

Football (soccer)
Copa Libertadores Finals second leg (first leg score in parentheses): Corinthians  2–0 (1–1)  Boca Juniors. Corinthians win 3–1 on aggregate.
Arab U–17 Cup in Tunisia:
Group C:  0–3 
Arab U-20 Championship in Amman, Jordan
Group A:
 2–3 
 1–1

Inline hockey
Men's Junior World Inline Hockey Championship in Bucaramanga, Colombia:
Group stage:
Ecuador  2–10  Brazil
Mexico  5–3  Australia
Switzerland  0–4  Czech Republic
Colombia  –  Ecuador
United States  – 
Women's World Inline Hockey Championship in Bucaramanga, Colombia:
Group stage:
Argentina  9–0  Brazil
Mexico  0–1  Australia
Canada  – 
Colombia  –  Australia
United States  –

Poker
World Series of Poker in Las Vegas, United States:
Event #54: $1,000 No Limit Hold'em
 Will Jaffe   Luis Campelo   Joseph Kuether 
Event #56: $1,500 No Limit Hold'em
 Tomas Junek   David Borg   Donald Vogel

Tennis
Wimbledon Championships in London, Great Britain, day 9:
Men's Singles Quarterfinals:
Novak Djokovic  [1] def. Florian Mayer  [31] 6–4, 6–1, 6–4
Roger Federer  [3] def. Mikhail Youzhny  [26] 6–1, 6–2, 6–2
Andy Murray  [4] def. David Ferrer  [7] 6–7(7–5), 7–6(8–6), 6–4, 7–6(7–4)
Jo-Wilfried Tsonga  [5] def. Philipp Kohlschreiber  [27] 7–6(7–5), 4–6, 7–6(7–3), 6–2

Volleyball
FIVB World League Final round in Sofia, Bulgaria:
Pool E:  3–1 
Pool F:  3–0

3 July 2012 (Tuesday)

Basketball
FIBA World Olympic Qualifying Tournament for Men in Caracas, Venezuela:
Group A:  52–93 
Group B:  82–100 
Group C:  85–95 
Group D:  84–62 
FIBA Under-17 World Championship in Kaunas, Lithuania:
Group A:
 71–68 
 88–73 
 86–50 
Group B:
 83–62 
 106–59 
 82–78

Bridge
European Youth Pairs Championships in Vejle, Denmark:
Mixed pairs:  Justyna Zmuda / Bartlomiej Igla   Joanna Taczewska / Piotr Zatorski   Signe Buus Thomsen / Dennis Bilde

Bowling
World Youth Bowling Championships in Bangkok, Thailand:
Boys masters:  Daniel Fransson   Chris Via   Sam Cooley  and Marshall Kent 
Girls masters:  Hwang Yeon-ju   Jacqueline J Sijore   Bernice Lim  and Dayang Khairuniza

Cycling
Tour de France:
Stage 3:  Peter Sagan   Edvald Boasson Hagen   Peter Velits 
General classification:  Fabian Cancellara   Bradley Wiggins   Sylvain Chavanel 
Points:  Peter Sagan , Mountains:  Michael Mørkøv , Young:  Tejay van Garderen , Team:  Team Sky , Combat:  Michael Mørkøv 
Tour of Austria:
Stage 3:  Sacha Modolo   Daniel Schorn   Francesco Gavazzi 
General classification:  Danilo Di Luca 
Tour of Qinghai Lake:
Stage 5:  Juan José Lobato   Kiel Reijnen   Artur Ershov 
General classification:  Hossein Alizadeh 
Giro d'Italia Femminile:
Stage 5:  Tiffany Cromwell   Giorgia Bronzini   Valentina Scandolara 
General classification:  Marianne Vos

Football (soccer)
UEFA Champions League First qualifying round, first leg:
F91 Dudelange  7–0 Tre Penne 
Valletta  8–0 Lusitanos 
Linfield  0–0 B36 Tórshavn 
UEFA Europa League First qualifying round, first leg:
Víkingur  0–6 Gomel 
Shkëndija  0–0 Portadown 
Arab Nations Cup in Saudi Arabia:
Semi finals:
 0–2 
 2–1 
Arab U–17 Cup in Tunisia:
Group B:  1–7 
UEFA European Under-19 Championship in Estonia:
Group A:
 1–2 
 0–3 
Group B:
 1–1 
 0–3

Inline hockey
Men's Junior World Inline Hockey Championship in Bucaramanga, Colombia:
Group stage:
Mexico  2–5 
Ecuador  0–16  Switzerland
Brazil  0–16  Czech Republic
Australia  2–11 
Czech Republic  5–2  Colombia
Women's World Inline Hockey Championship in Bucaramanga, Colombia:
Group stage:
Argentina  1–12 
Australia  0–3 
Brazil  0–9 
Spain  8–0  Colombia
Mexico  0–7

Poker
World Series of Poker in Las Vegas, United States:
Event #53: $1,500 No Limit Hold'em
 Jim Willerson   Vladimir Mefodichev   Hugh Henderson 
Event #55: $1,000,000 The Big One for One Drop
 Antonio Esfandiari   Sam Trickett   David Einhorn

Pool billiards
World Pool Team Championship in Beijing, China
Group A:
Indonesia  5–1  Estonia
Philippines  6–0  Croatia
Group B:
Canada  5–1  Malaysia
China 1  6–0  Finland
Group C:
Australia  3–3  Singapore
China 2  5–1  Hong Kong
Group D:
Poland  5–1  Vietnam
Japan  2–4  Sweden
Group E:
India  5–1  South Africa
Great Britain  3–3  South Korea
Group F:
Norway  4–2  Mongolia
Chinese Taipei  4–2

Tennis
Wimbledon Championships in London, Great Britain, day 8:
Men's singles fourth round:
Florian Mayer  [31] def. Richard Gasquet  [18] 6–3 6–1 3–6 6–2
David Ferrer  [7] def. Juan Martín del Potro  [9] 6–3 6–2 6–3
Andy Murray  [4] def. Marin Čilić  [16] 7–5 6–2 6–3
Jo-Wilfried Tsonga  [5] def. Mardy Fish  [10] 4–6 7–6 6–4 6–4
Philipp Kohlschreiber  [27] def. Brian Baker  [Q] 6–1 7–6 6–3
Women's singles quarter finals:
Angelique Kerber  [8] def. Sabine Lisicki  [15] 6–3 6–7 7–5
Serena Williams  [6] def. Petra Kvitová  [4] 6–3 7–5
Victoria Azarenka  [2] def. Tamira Paszek  [Q] 6–3 7–6
Agnieszka Radwańska  [3] def. Maria Kirilenko  [17] 7–5, 4–6, 7–5

2 July 2012 (Monday)

Basketball
FIBA World Olympic Qualifying Tournament for Men in Caracas, Venezuela:
Group A:  107–63 
Group B:  69–71 
Group C:  91–56 
Group D:  88–84

Bowling
World Youth Bowling Championships in Bangkok, Thailand:
Boys all events:  Sam Cooley   Marshall Kent   Daniel Fransson 
Girls all events:  Hwang Yeon-ju   New Hui Fen   Kim Seon-jeong

Cycling
Tour de France:
Stage 2:  Mark Cavendish   André Greipel   Matthew Goss 
General classification:  Fabian Cancellara   Bradley Wiggins   Sylvain Chavanel 
Points:  Peter Sagan , Mountains:  Michael Mørkøv , Young:  Tejay van Garderen , Team:  Team Sky , Combat:  Anthony Roux 
 

Tour of Qinghai Lake:
Stage 4:  Luka Mezgec   Kiel Reijnen   Kevin Claeys 
General classification:  Hossein Alizadeh 
Tour of Austria:
Stage 2:  Danilo Di Luca   Steve Morabito   Thomas Rohregger 
General classification:  Danilo Di Luca 
Giro d'Italia Femminile:
Stage 4:  Marianne Vos   Emma Johansson   Tatiana Guderzo 
General classification:  Marianne Vos

Football (soccer)
UEFA Women's U-19 Championship in Turkey:
Group A:
 1–0 
 0–0 
Group B:
 0–1 
 3–0 
Arab U–17 Cup in Tunisia:
Group A:
 2–1 
 4–2

Handball
Women's Junior World Handball Championship in Czech Republic:
Group A:
 22–37 
 12–24 
 25–26 
Group B:
 20–29 
 25–48 
 15–22 
Group C:
 27–34 
 20–30 
 25–38 
Group D:
 24–22 
 22–22 
 20–33

Inline hockey
Men's Junior World Inline Hockey Championship in Bucaramanga, Colombia:
Group stage:
France  11–2  Australia
Czech Republic  20–0  Ecuador
Brazil  1–8  Switzerland
United States  9–1  Mexico
Colombia  4–0  Brazil
Women's World Inline Hockey Championship in Bucaramanga, Colombia:
Group stage:
France  6–3  Argentina
United States  3–1  Mexico
Canada  12–0  Brazil
Colombia  0–6 
Spain  7–1  Australia

Pool billiards
World Pool Team Championship in Beijing, China
Group A:
Indonesia  6–0  Croatia
Philippines  5–1  Estonia
Group B:
Canada  4–2  Finland
China 1  4–2  Malaysia
Group C:
Australia  3–3  Hong Kong
China 2  6–0  Singapore
Group D:
Poland  3–3  Sweden
Japan  4–2  Vietnam
Group E:
South Korea  5–1  South Africa
Great Britain  6–0  India
Group F:
Germany  6–0  Mongolia
Chinese Taipei  6–0  Norway

Softball
Women's World Cup of Softball in Oklahoma City, United States
Gold medal match:  United States  3–0   Australia
Bronze medal match:  Canada  11–8  Netherlands
5th place play-off: Puerto Rico  4–1  Brazil

Tennis
Wimbledon Championships in London, Great Britain, day 7:
Men's singles fourth round:
Novak Djokovic  [1] def. Viktor Troicki  6–3 6–1 6–3
Roger Federer  [3] def. Xavier Malisse  7–6 6–1 4–6 6–3
Mikhail Youzhny  def. Denis Istomin  6–3 5–7 6–4 6–7 7–5
Women's singles fourth round:
Sabine Lisicki  [15] def. Maria Sharapova [1]  6–4 6–3
Angelique Kerber  [8] def. Kim Clijsters  6–1 6–1
Agnieszka Radwańska  [3] def. Camila Giorgi  [Q] 6–2 6–3
Maria Kirilenko  [17] def. Peng Shuai  [30] 6–1 6–7 6–3
Serena Williams  [6] def. Yaroslava Shvedova  [WC] 6–1 2–6 7–5
Petra Kvitová  [4] def. Francesca Schiavone  [24] 4–6 7–5 6–1
Tamira Paszek  def. Roberta Vinci  [21] 6–2 6–2
Victoria Azarenka  [2] def. Ana Ivanovic  [14] 6–1 6–0

1 July 2012 (Sunday)

Athletics
European Athletics Championships in Helsinki, Finland:
Men:
1500m:  Henrik Ingebrigtsen   Florian Carvalho   David Bustos 
110m hurdles:  Sergey Shubenkov   Garfield Darien   Artur Noga 
Long jump:  Sebastian Bayer   Luis Méliz   Michel Tornéus 
Pole vault:  Renaud Lavillenie   Björn Otto   Raphael Holzdeppe 
4 × 100 m relay:  Brian Mariano / Churandy Martina / Giovanni Codrington / Patrick van Luijk   Julian Reus / Tobias Unger / Alexander Kosenkow / Lucas Jakubczyk   Ronald Pognon / Christophe Lemaitre / Pierre-Alexis Pessonneaux / Emmanuel Biron 
4 × 400 m relay:  Antoine Gillet / Jonathan Borlée / Jente Bouckaert / Kevin Borlée   Nigel Levine / Conrad Williams / Robert Tobin / Richard Buck   Jonas Plass / Kamghe Gaba / Eric Krüger / Thomas Schneider 
Women:
1500m:  Aslı Çakır Alptekin   Gamze Bulut   Anna Mishchenko 
10,000m:  Ana Dulce Félix   Joanne Pavey   Olha Skrypak 
Discus throw:  Sandra Perković   Nadine Müller   Natalya Semenova 
Hammer throw:  Anita Włodarczyk   Martina Hrašnová   Anna Bulgakova 
4 × 100 m relay:  Leena Günther / Anne Cibis / Tatjana Lofamakanda Pinto / Verena Sailer   Kadene Vassell / Dafne Schippers / Eva Lubbers / Jamile Samuel   Marika Popowicz / Daria Korczyńska / Marta Jeschke / Ewelina Ptak 
4 × 400 m relay:  Yuilya Olishevska / Olha Zemlyak / Nataliya Pyhyda / Alina Lohvynenko   Phara Anacharsis / Lenora Guion Firmin / Marie Gayot / Floria Gueï   Zuzana Hejnová / Zuzana Bergrová / Jitka Bartoničková / Denisa Rosolová 
Gold Coast Marathon in Gold Coast, Queensland, Australia:
Men:
Marathon:  Alemayehu Shumye   Robert Mwangi   Ernest Kebenei 
Half marathon:  Liam Adams   Harry Summers   Shinichi Yamashita 
10 km run:  Patrick Tiernan   Hugh Williams   Daryl Crook 
Women:
Marathon:  Kaori Yoshida   Madoka Ogi   Hellen Jemaiyo Kimutai 
Half marathon:  Alex Watson   Narumi Shirataki   Lisa Robertson 
10 km run:  Lisa Jane Weightman   Emma Moffatt   Melanie Daniels 
White Nights International Marathon in Saint Petersburg, Russia:
Men:
Marathon:  Hassane Ahouchar   Geoffren Kiplagat Toroitich   Andrey Minakov 
10 km run:  Dmitry Lukin   Artem Agapov   Mikhail Kulkov 
Women:
Marathon:  Vera Trubnikova   Tatiana Vilisova   Alevtina Ivanova 
10 km run:  Maria Babich   Nyuganya Burtseva   Veronika Mihaylova

Basketball
FIBA World Olympic Qualifying Tournament for Women in Ankara, Turkey:
Final:  71–63 
FIBA Under-17 World Championship in Kaunas, Lithuania:
Group A:
 53–59 
 58–63 
 73–111 
Group B:
 68–124 
 83–91 
 80–76

Beach volleyball
FIVB World Cup Tournament in Moscow, Russia:
Men's semi final:
Austria  2–0  Mexico
Alexander Huber / Robin Seidl 2–1 Lombardo Ontiveros / Ulises Ontiveros
Clemens Doppler / Alexander Horst 2–0 Juan Virgen / Aldo Miramontes
Russia  2–0  Poland
Yury Bogatov / Dmitri Barsouk 2–0 Bartosz Losiak / Piotr Kantor
Konstantin Semenov / Serguei Prokopiev 2–0 Michal Kadziola / Jakub Szalankiewicz
Women's semi final:
Italy  0–2  Netherlands
Daniela Gioria / Giulia Momoli 1–2 Madelein Meppelink / Sophie van Gestel
Laura Giombini / Viktoria Orsi Toth 0–2 Michelle Stiekema / Rimke Braakman
Russia  2–0 
Anastasia Vasina / Anna Vozakova 2–1 Changning Zhang / Yuanyuan Ma
Maria Bratkova / Svetlana Popova 2–1 Fan Wang / Yuan Yue
All nations winning in the semi final qualify one team to the 2012 Olympics.
CEV Men's Satellite Tournament in Lausanne, Switzerland:
 Jefferson Bellaguarda / Patrick Heuscher Finn Dittelbach / Steffen Drossler   Phil Gabathuler / Mirco Gerson

BMX
UCI Tour – Great Salt Lake Nationals in South Jordan, Utah, United States
Men:  Sam Willoughby   Mike Day   Barry Nobles 
Women:  Caroline Buchanan   Dominique Daniels   Dani George

Bowling
World Youth Bowling Championships in Bangkok, Thailand:
Boys teams:  Andrew Koff / Zack Hattori / Chris Via / Marshall Kent   Basil Low / Keith Saw / Ng Chiew Pang / Mark Wong   Kim Bolleby / Magnus Johnson / Daniel Fransson / Johan Hellden 
Girls teams:  Jessica Earnest / Kelsey Muther / Amanda Greene / Danielle McEwan   New Hui Fen / Ilma Nur Jannah / Krishna Darshini / Bernice Lim   Kim Seon-jeong / Oh Nuri / Kim Ga-ram / Hwang Yeon-ju

Canoeing
ICF Wildwater Canoeing World Championships in La Plagne, France
Men:
C1 Sprint:  Guillaume Alzingre   Igor Gojic   Emil Milihram 
C2 Sprint:  Guillaume Alzingre / Yann Claudepierre   Damien Guyonnet / Gaetan Guyonnet   Michal Sramek / Lukas Tomek 
K1 Sprint:  Nejc Znidarcic   Tobias Bong   Ben Oakley 
C1 Sprint team:  Yann Claudepierre / Guillaume Alzingre / Louison Tanet   Igor Gojic / Tomislav Lepan / Emil Milihram   Ondrej Rolenc / Lukas Novosad / Tomas Kejklicek 
C2 Sprint team:  Yann Claudepierre / Guillaume Alzingre / Tom Bar / Mickaël Cordier / Damien Guyonnet / Gaetan Guyonnet   Michal Cuc / Jan Zdrahal / Michal Sramek / Lukas Tomek / Jan Šťastný / Ondrej Rolenc   Johannes Baumann / Lars Walter / Stephan Stiefenhoffer / Guido Wahl / Maik Schmitz / Matthias Nies 
K1 Sprint team:  Nejc Znidarcic / Tim Kolar / Maks Franceskin   Tomas Slovak / Karel Slepica / Richard Hala   Paolo Bifano / Mariano Bifano / Jaka Jazbec 
Women:
C1 Sprint:  Marjolaine Hecquet   Julie Paoletti   Hana Peterkova 
K1 Sprint:  Claire Bren   Laetitia Parage   Sixtine Malaterre 
K1 Sprint team:  Alke Overbeck / Manuela Stoberl / Sabine Füsser   Sixtine Malaterre / Laetitia Parage / Claire Bren   Sabine Eichenberger / Chantal Abgottspon / Melanie Mathys

Cricket
Australia in England:
2nd ODI at The Oval, London:  251/7 (50 overs);  252/4 (45.4 overs). England win by 6 wickets and lead 5-match series 2–0.
New Zealand in West Indies:
2nd T20I in Lauderhill, Florida:  177/5 (20 overs);  116 (18.4 overs). West Indies win by 61 runs and win the 2-match series 2–0.
India women in England:
1st ODI at Lord's, London:  229 (49.1 overs);  230/5 (49.3 overs). India win by 5 wickets and lead the 5-match series 1–0.
U-19 Asian Cup in Kuala Lumpur, Malaysia:
Final:  282/9 (50 overs);  282/8 (50 overs). Match tied.

Cycling
Tour de France:
Stage 1:  Peter Sagan   Fabian Cancellara   Edvald Boasson Hagen 
General classification:  Fabian Cancellara   Bradley Wiggins   Sylvain Chavanel 
Points:  Fabian Cancellara , Mountains:  Michael Mørkøv , Young:  Tejay van Garderen , Team:  Team Sky , Combat:  Nicolas Edet 
Czech Cycling Tour:
Stage 4:  Matej Jurčo   Jaka Bostner   Josef Černý 
General classification:  Frantisek Padour   Pavel Kochetkov   Sven van Luijk 
Tour of Qinghai Lake in China:
Stage 3:  Hossein Alizadeh   Walter Pedraza   Sergey Firsanov 
General classification:  Hossein Alizadeh 
Tour of Austria:
Stage 1:  Alessandro Bazzana   Francesco Gavazzi   Marco Canola 
General classification:  Alessandro Bazzana 
Giro d'Italia Femminile:
Stage 3:  Evelyn Stevens   Fabiana Luperini   Emma Pooley 
General classification:  Evelyn Stevens 
Elorrio Classic in Elorrio, Spain:
 Inmaculada Pereiro   Ana Santesteban   Irene San Sebastian 
Classic Féminine Vienna Poitou-Charentes in France:
 Audrey Cordon   Aude Biannic   Fiona Dutriaux

Darts
PDC Players Championship #10 in Crawley, Great Britain:
Final: Colin Lloyd  6–5  Andy Hamilton

Fencing
FIE Fencing World Cup in Leipzig, Germany:
Women's epée team:  Poland   Estonia   Italy 

FIE Fencing World Cup in Buenos Aires, Argentina:
Men's epée team:  Hungary   Canada   Switzerland 

FIE Fencing World Cup in Havana, Cuba:
Men's foil team:  Italy   China   Egypt

Football (soccer)
UEFA Euro 2012 Final in Kyiv, Ukraine:  4–0 
Spain wins the title for the second successive time and becomes the first team to do so.
Malaysia FAM League ends
 Kuala Lumpur SPA [38p]  Shahzan Muda [34p]  UiTM FC [34p]
Kuala Lumpur SPA wins promotion to the Malaysian Premier League

Golf
PGA Tour:
AT&T National in Bethesda, Maryland:
 Tiger Woods   Bo Van Pelt   Adam Scott 
Senior majors:
Senior Players Championship in Pittsburgh, Pennsylvania:
 Joe Daley   Tom Lehman   Olin Browne 
European Tour:
Irish Open in Portrush, Northern Ireland:
 Jamie Donaldson   Rafael Cabrera-Bello   Anthony Wall 
LPGA Tour:
Walmart NW Arkansas Championship in Rogers, Arkansas:
 Ai Miyazato   Mika Miyazato  / Azahara Muñoz  (tied)

Handball
Women's Junior World Handball Championship in Czech Republic
Group A:
 29–19 
 25–22 
 37–22 
Group B:
 42–13 
 32–22 
 19–18 
Group C:
 37–29 
 28–16 
 33–15 
Group D:
 29–32 
 37–28 
 21–22

Inline hockey
Women's World Inline Hockey Championship in Bucaramanga, Colombia:
Group stage:
Mexico  3–0  Colombia

Kiteboarding
Slalom World Championships in Westerland, Germany:
Men:  Julien Kerneur   Maxime Nocher   Rolf van der Vlugt 
Women:  Katja Roose   Caroline Adrien   Kristin Boese

Motorsports
2012 British Formula Three season at the Norisring, Germany:
 Felix Serralles   Hannes van Asseldonk   Pietro Fantin 
2012 Eurocup Formula Renault 2.0 season at the Nürburgring, Germany:
 Stoffel Vandoorne   Melville McKee   Pierre Gasly 
2012 FIA European Formula 3 Championship season at the Norisring in Germany:
 Raffaele Marciello   Daniel Juncadella   Emil Bernstorff 
2012 Formula Renault 3.5 Series season at the Nürburgring, Germany:
 Nick Yelloly   Marco Sørensen   André Negrão 
2012 Deutsche Tourenwagen Masters season at the Norisring, Germany:
 Jamie Green   Martin Tomczyk   Bruno Spengler 
2012 FIM Motocross World Championship season in Uddevalla, Sweden:
MX1:
Race 1:  Clement Desalle   Christophe Pourcel   Sébastien Pource 
Race 2:  Clement Desalle   Christophe Pourcel   Kevin Strijbos 
MX2:
Race 1:  Jeffrey Herlings   Tommy Searle   Joël Roelants 
Race 2:  Tommy Searle   Jeremy Van Horebeek   Dylan Ferrandis 
MX3:
Race 1:  Martin Michek   Klemen Gercar   Michael Staufer 
Race 2:  Martin Michek   Matthias Walkner   Klemen Gercar 
2012 Superbike World Championship season at Motorland Aragón, Spain
Race 1:  Max Biaggi   Marco Melandri   Carlos Checa 
Race 2:  Marco Melandri   Eugene Laverty   Chaz Davies 
2012 Supersport World Championship season at Motorland Aragón, Spain
 Sam Lowes   Fabien Foret   Sheridan Morais

Mountain biking
UCI World Cup in Windham, New York, United States:
Men downhill:  Aaron Gwin   Steve Smith   Gee Atherton 
Women downhill:  Rachel Atherton   Tracey Hannah   Emmeline Ragot

Poker
World Series of Poker in Las Vegas, United States:
Event #50: $5,000 No Limit Hold'em
 Pete Vilandros   Kyle Julius   Dan Smith 
Event #51: $1,000 Ladies No Limit Hold'em Championship
 Yen Dang   Debbie Pechac   Janet Howard 
Event #52: $2,500 10-Game Mix Six Handed
 Vanessa Selbst   Michael Saltzburg   Tam Hang

Pool billiards
World Pool Team Championship in Beijing, China
Group A:
Philippines  4–2  Indonesia
Croatia  5–1  Estonia
Group B:
China 1  5–1 
Finland  4–2  Malaysia
Group C:
China 2  4–2  Australia
Hong Kong  3–3  Singapore
Group D:
Japan  4–2  Poland
Sweden  3–3  Vietnam
Group E:
Great Britain  6–0  South Africa
South Korea  6–0  India
Group F:
Chinese Taipei  6–0  Mongolia
Germany  3–3  Norway

Sepaktakraw
ISTAF Super Series in Bangkok, Thailand
Men:
Gold medal match:  Thailand  def. Malaysia   15–8 15–11 15–10
Bronze medal match:  South Korea  def. Singapore  15–10 15–8 9–15 15–11
Women:
Gold medal match:  Thailand  def. Vietnam   15–11 15–5 15–9
Bronze medal match:  South Korea  def. Malaysia  14–16 15–9 15–13 15–13

Ski jumping
Continental Cup in Stams, Austria:
Men's HS115:  Lukas Müller   Anders Jacobsen   Dawid Kubacki

Snooker
Wuxi Classic in Wuxi, China
Final:  Stuart Bingham 4–10 Ricky Walden

Softball
Women's World Cup of Softball in Oklahoma City, United States
Group stage:
United States  9–0  Brazil
Australia  4–0  Netherlands
Canada  7–0  Puerto Rico
Canada  13–0  Brazil

X Games
X Games XVIII in Los Angeles, United States:
Open:
BMX Freestyle Big Air:  Steve McCann   Zack Warden   Kevin Robinson 
Men:
Skateboard:  Paul Rodriguez   Ryan Sheckler   Nyjah Huston 
RallyCross:  Sébastien Loeb   Ken Block   Brian Deegan 
Moto X Eduro X:  Mike Brown   Cody Webb   Cory Graffunder 
Women:
Moto X Eduro X:  Maria Forsberg   Louise Forsley   Chantelle Bykerk

Volleyball
FIVB World Grand Prix:
Final Round in Ningbo, China:
  1–3  
 3–0 
 0–3  
Final standings: United States 14 points, Brazil 13, Turkey 9, Thailand 5, China 4, Cuba 0.
The United States win the title for the fifth time.
FIVB World League, Week 4: (teams in bold advance to final round)
Pool C:
 3–0 
 3–2 
Pool D:
 2–3 
 3–2

References

VII
July 2012 sports events